Ben Trigger (born 27 May 2006) is a speedway rider from Plymouth England.

Career
In 2021, he won the British 500cc Youth Championship and signed for the Leicester Lion Cubs for the 2021 National Development League speedway season. In 2022, he signed for Plymouth Centurions for the 2022 National Development League speedway season. He missed some of the season after fracturing his tibia.

After a successful season (despite the injury) Trigger gained a call up to the Plymouth first team and was named in their seven starters for the SGB Championship 2023. He also signed for Mildenhall Fen Tigers for the 2023 NDL season.

References 

2006 births
Living people
British speedway riders
Mildenhall Fen Tigers riders
Plymouth Gladiators speedway riders